Biochemical Genetics is a bimonthly peer-reviewed scientific journal covering molecular biology as it relates to genetics. It was established in 1967 and is published by Springer Science+Business Media. The editor-in-chief is Luís Filipe Dias e Silva (University of the Azores). According to the Journal Citation Reports, the journal has a 2021 impact factor of 2.220.

References

External links

Publications established in 1967
Genetics journals
Monthly journals
Springer Science+Business Media academic journals
Molecular and cellular biology journals
English-language journals